The women's competition of the High diving events at the 2013 World Aquatics Championships was held on 30 July 2013. The competition was divided into three rounds with jumps of 20m.

Results
The final was started at 16:00.

References

Women
World